Rational Youth was the eponymous EP by Rational Youth, and the band's first release under their Capitol contract. It was released on CD in 2000 as part of the Early Singles box.

Track listing
"In Your Eyes" - 2:53
"Just a Sound in the Night" - 3:48
"Latin Lovers" - 3:54
"Holiday in Bangkok" - 5:28
"The Man in Grey" - 3:24

Personnel
 Tracy Howe - vocals, synthesizers
 Denis Duran - bass
 Kevin Akira Komoda - keyboards
 Angel Calvo - drums, percussion

Special Guests
 Roman Martyn - guitars
 Bill Vorn - synthesizer programming on "Holiday in Bangkok"
 Joel Zifkin - violin on "Holiday in Bangkok"

Rational Youth albums
1983 EPs